The UKRC (UK Resource Centre) is a UK organisation for the provision of advice, services and policy consultation regarding the under-representation of women in science, engineering, technology and the built environment (SET).
It is funded by the Department for Business, Innovation and Skills and was launched in 2004.

The central base is located in Bradford in the North of England but there are also centres in South East England, South Yorkshire, Scotland and Wales.

The UKRC works to promote gender equality in SET with employers and professional bodies; education institutions; women's organisations and networks; policy institutes; sector skills councils; the government and many others. This includes implementing the Athena SWAN Charter.

In 2011 it took over the leadership of the WISE Campaign and became UKRC-WISE. In late 2012 it took on the WISE name.

See also
Women of Outstanding Achievement Photographic Exhibition

Sources

External links
 The WISE official website
 The Athena SWAN official website

2004 establishments in the United Kingdom
Gender studies organizations
Scientific organisations based in the United Kingdom
Scientific organizations established in 2004
Organisations based in Bradford
Organizations for women in science and technology
Science and technology in West Yorkshire
Women's organisations based in the United Kingdom